Macrobrachium zariquieyi is a freshwater prawn belonging to the genus Macrobrachium and the family Palaemonidae. It is found in West Africa and reported in Côte d'Ivoire river. The species name of this species is dedicated to Ricardo Zariquiey who worked on Spanish decapods.

References

Palaemonidae